The 2020-21 American International Yellow Jackets men's ice hockey season was the 73rd season of play for the program, the 25th at the Division I level, and the 18th season in the Atlantic Hockey conference. The Yellow Jackets represented American International College and were coached by Eric Lang, in his 5th season.

The start of the college hockey season was delayed due to the ongoing coronavirus pandemic. As a result, American International's first scheduled game was in late-November as opposed to early-October, which was the norm.

Season
As a result of the ongoing COVID-19 pandemic the entire college ice hockey season was delayed. Because the NCAA had previously announced that all winter sports athletes would retain whatever eligibility they possessed through at least the following year, none of American International's players would lose a season of play. However, the NCAA also approved a change in its transfer regulations that would allow players to transfer and play immediately rather than having to sit out a season, as the rules previously required.

American International entered the season needing to replace a great deal of experience on its roster. The Yellow Jackets had more than a third of the previous team's players leave, mostly through graduation, and the remaining upperclassmen would need to remain steady while the coaching staff brought the new players along. The large influx of players included the program's first ever NHL draft pick in Jake Kucharski, a transfer from Providence, which demonstrated how much the program had risen in Eric Lang's short time as head coach. The team got off to a good start, winning their first five matches, but AIC faced its first big test in late December when they played Quinnipiac. The Yellow Jackets were embarrassed in the first game but recovered in the second; though they lost the team did show that it could compete with other ranked teams. As a result the team's national ranking fell just one spot despite losing both games.

AIC played well over the next month, going 8–1 and placing themselves as the team to beat in Atlantic Hockey. Unfortunately, COVID cancellations torpedoed the team's schedule and the Yellow Jackets didn't play a single game over the succeeding 7 weeks. Even the team's quarterfinal match in the conference tournament was scratched due to COVID. When the Jackets finally played a game the team looked a bit out of sorts. They were finally able to knock some of the rust off in the third period of their semifinal game to escape with a 2–1 win. They had to come from behind to win the championship as well but the title gave AIC every league crown for a three-year period, making them the first Atlantic Hockey program to achieve that feat.

Despite a stellar 15–3 record and both conference championships (regular- and post-season) AIC was given the 16th-overall seed in the NCAA Tournament and had to face top-seeded North Dakota in the opening round. The Yellow Jackets still appeared rusty at the start of the game, surrendering 4 goals and being outshot 7–13. The huge lead allowed UND to hang back and play defense for the remainder of the match, giving the Jackets few opportunities to cut into the lead. AIC eventually lost 1–5 but the question remains; just how badly was the team affected by their neatly 2-month layoff?

Departures

Recruiting

Roster
As of September 27, 2020.

|}
† Egle left the program after playing one game.

Standings

Schedule and results

|-
!colspan=12 style=";" | Regular season

|-
!colspan=12 style=";" | 

|-
!colspan=12 style=";" |

Scoring statistics

Goaltending statistics

† Kucharski and McInchak split a shutout on January 29.

Rankings

USCHO did not release a poll in week 20.

Awards and honors

References

2020–21
2020–21 Atlantic Hockey men's ice hockey season
2020–21 NCAA Division I men's ice hockey by team
2020–21 in American ice hockey by team
2021 in sports in Massachusetts
2020 in sports in Massachusetts